This is a list of libraries in 18th-century Connecticut. It includes subscription, rental, church, and academic libraries. In general, it excludes book collections of private individuals.

Abington
 Social Library Association of Abington

Barkhamsted
 Barkhamsted Library (est.1797)

Berlin
 Kensington Parish Library, Berlin (est. ca.1788)

Bristol
 First Society in Bristol (est.1792)

Brooklyn
 Union Library, Brooklyn (est.1774)

Chatham
 Republican Library Company, Chatham (est.1795)

Chelsea
 T. Hubbard's circulating library, Chelsea

Cheshire
 Cheshire Library Society (est.1792)
 Library in Salem Society, Cheshire (est.1783)
 Library in the Society of Columbia, Cheshire (est.1793)

Cornwall
 United Proprietors Library, Cornwall (ca.1799-1804)

Danbury
 Franklin Library, Danbury (1770–1833)
 Library in Bethel Society, Danbury (est.1793)

Durham
 Book Company of Durham (1733–1856)
 Ethosian Society, Durham (1787–1793)
 New Library Company, Durham (est.1788)

East Haddam
 Hadlyme Society, East Haddam (est.179)

East Hartford
 First Library Company, East Hartford (est.1794)
 Union Library, East Hartford (est.1791)

East Haven
 Union Library, East Haven (est.1796)

East Windsor
 Federal Library, East Windsor (est. ca.17890
 Social Library in East Windsor (est.1791)

Farmington
 Library in First Society, Farmington (est.1795)
 Northington Public Library, Farmington (1789-ca.1799)

Franklin
 Franklin Library, Franklin (est.1790)

Griswold
 North Preston Parish Library, Griswold (est.1761)
 Union Circle of Friends, Griswold (1795–1821)

Guilford
 Library of Killingworth, Lyme, Saybrook and Guilford (est.1737; located in Guilford)
 Library of Saybrook, Lime, and Guilford
 Library in First Society, Guilford (est.1790)

Hadlyme
 Hadlyme Library (est.1789)

Hartford
 Hartford Library Company

Harwinton
 Episcopalian Society Library, Harwinton (est.1793)
 Juvenile Library, Harwinton (est.1797)
 Union Harwinton Library (1798–1857)

Lebanon
 Philogrammatican Society, Lebanon

Litchfield
 St. Paul's Lodge Library, Litchfield (est.1781)

Madison
 Farmer's Library, Madison (est.1793)

Mansfield
 Proprietors Library North Society, Mansfield (est.1795)
 Proprietors Library South Society, Mansfield (est.1795)

Middletown
 Library Company in Middletown (est.1765)
 Middletown Library

Milford
 Associate Library, Milford (1761–1820)
 Milford Library (est.1745)

Naugatuck
 Library in Salem Society, Naugatuck (est.1783)

New Haven
 Mechanic Library Society of New-Haven (est.1793)
 New Haven Library Company
 Yale College Library

New London
 S. Green's Circulating Library, New London

New Milford
 Union Library, New-Milford (est.1796)

Newington
 Book Company in Newington (est.1752)
 Charity Library, Newington (est.1787)

North Haven
 Northill Library, North Haven (est.1792)

Northington
 Northington Public Library

Norwich
 Franklin Library Company, Norwich
 Library in First Society, Norwich (est. 1796)
 Norwich Library Company (est.1793)
 John Trumbull's circulating library, Norwich (est.1796)
 Samuel Trumbull's circulating library, Norwich

Pomfret
 Social Library of Abington in Pomfret (est.1793)
 United English Library for the Propagation of Christian and Useful Knowledge, Pomfret (1739–1805)

Saybrook
 Library of Second Society, Saybrook (est.1795)

Southington
 Union Library Society, Southington (1797–1847)

Stonington
 Stonington Point Library (est.1793)

Suffield
 Suffield Library (est.1791)

Tolland
 Tolland Proprietary Library (est.1787)

Torrington
 Public Library of Torrington and Winchester (est.1787; located in Torrington)

Warren
 Free Mason Lodge Library, Warren (est.1799)
 Public Library in Warren (est.1770)
 Warren library

Waterbury
 Library in First Society, Waterbury (est.1771)
 Union Library, Waterbury (est. ca.1797)

Watertown
 Union Library Society, Watertown (est.1799)

West Simsbury
 Friendship Library, West Symsbury (est.1793)

Weston
 North Fairfield Library, Weston (est. ca.1790)

Wethersfield
 Social Library in Stepney Parish, Wethersfield (est.1794)
 Union Library Society of Wethersfield (1783–1850)

Winchester
 Society of Winsted, Winchester (est.1799)

Windham
 Library Company in Scotland, Widham (1791–1830)
 Library in First Society, Windham (ca.1795-1798)

Wolcott
 Library in Farmingbury, Wolcott (est.1779)

Woodbridge
 Library in Woodbridge (est.1787)

Woodbury
 Union Library, Woodbury (est.1772)

Woodstock
 Library of First Society, Woodstock (est.1797)
 United Lyon Library of Woodstock, also called: United Lynn Library (est.1768)

References

External links
 Princeton University. Davies Project. American Libraries before 1876.

Libraries
Connecticut
Libraries
Libraries
Libraries in Connecticut
Connecticut
Connecticut
Libraries